Pritam Chakraborty (born 16 September 1994) is an Indian cricketer. He plays first-class cricket for Bengal.

See also
 List of Bengal cricketers

References

External links
 

1994 births
Living people
Indian cricketers
Bengal cricketers
People from Howrah